The seventh cycle of Holland's Next Top Model premiered on 1 September 2014 on RTL5. This was the second cycle of the series to be hosted by Anouk Smulders. Previous judges Sharon Mor Yosef and Sabine Geurten did not return for the new cycle. They were replaced by photographer Dirk Kikstra and magazine editor May-Britt Mobach, respectively. Fred van Leer remained in place as a mentor for the contestants.

The prizes for this cycle included a modelling contract with Touché Models valued at €50,000, an online feature in the style and fashion website Amayzine.com, replacing the sponsorship of the show's magazine, Glamour, and a brand new Renault Twingo.

The winner of the competition was 19-year-old Nicky Opheij from the province of North Brabant.

Format changes
The show scrapped the previous cycle's apartment reward for the best performing contestants, but still maintained the new elimination format.

The show once again held a separate wildcard contest, sponsored by Colgate, to choose an additional 13th contestant. Applicants were allowed to apply for the contest on the show's website, where the twenty-five candidates with the most votes from the public would be considered for a spot on the show. The winner of the search was 21 year-old Sanne de Roo from Groningen, who joined the 12 other finalists during the filming of the opening titles in episode 1.

During the cycle's live final, the position of the fourth and third placing contestants was decided through a consensus of the judges, while the viewer vote determined the winner from the remaining two contestants.

Cast

Contestants
(Ages stated are at start of contest)

Judges
Anouk Smulders (host)
 Dirk Kikstra  
 May-Britt Mobach

Other cast members
 Fred van Leer

Episodes

Call-out order

 The contestant was eliminated
 The contestant won the competition

Notes

References

External links
Official RTL5 website

Holland's Next Top Model
2014 Dutch television seasons